German submarine U-758 was a Type VIIC U-boat built for Nazi Germany's Kriegsmarine for service during World War II. Commissioned on 5 May 1942, she served with the 6th U-boat Flotilla until 1 November as a training boat, and as a front boat until 14 October 1944 mostly under the command of Kapitänleutnant Helmut Manseck before joining the 33rd U-boat Flotilla as a training boat for the remainder of her service in the war.

Design
German Type VIIC submarines were preceded by the shorter Type VIIB submarines. U-758 had a displacement of  when at the surface and  while submerged. She had two shafts and two  propellers.

U-758 was fitted with five  torpedo tubes (four fitted at the bow and one at the stern), fourteen torpedoes, one  SK C/35 naval gun, 220 rounds, and a  C/30 anti-aircraft gun. The boat had a complement of between forty-four and sixty.

Service history
Built at the Kriegsmarinewerft shipyard in Wilhelmshaven, U-758 served on seven patrols with the 6th U-boat Flotilla.

First patrol
The submarine's first patrol of 41 days between 14 November until 24 December 1942 from Kiel to St. Nazaire was uneventful.

Second patrol
Her second patrol from 14 February until 30 March 1943 was not. Midway across the Atlantic Ocean on 17 March, U-758 joined Wolfpack Raubgraf and attacked convoy HX 229 which was eastbound, delivering goods from the United States to the United Kingdom. U-758 destroyed two ships from the 37-ship convoy: The Dutch ship Zaanland and the US Liberty Ship James Oglethorpe. Torpedoes fired at the Dutch motor tanker Magdala missed their mark.

Subsequent patrols
U-758 undertook five more combat patrols but did not sink or damage any further ships.

Wolfpacks
U-758 took part in nine wolfpacks, namely:
 Panzer (23 November – 11 December 1942)
 Sturmbock (21 – 24 February 1943) 
 Burggraf (24 – 26 February 1943) 
 Wildfang (26 February – 5 March 1943) 
 Raubgraf (7 – 20 March 1943) 
 Leuthen (15 – 24 September 1943) 
 Rossbach (24 September – 9 October 1943) 
 Borkum (24 December 1943 – 3 January 1944) 
 Borkum 2 (3 – 13 January 1944)

Fate
The veteran submarine was caught in the open during a British raid on the port of Kiel. Badly damaged on 11 March 1945, she was stricken from the navy list on 16 March 1945. At the cessation of hostilities, she was surrendered to the Allies in May 1945. Deemed too badly damaged to be sunk as part of Operation Deadlight, she was instead broken up for scrap beginning in 1946 or 1947.

Summary of raiding history

References

Bibliography

External links

1942 ships
U-boats commissioned in 1942
Ships built in Wilhelmshaven
World War II submarines of Germany
German Type VIIC submarines
Maritime incidents in March 1945